Urban planning, also known as town planning, city planning, regional planning, or rural planning, is a technical and political process that is focused on the development and design of land use and the built environment, including air, water, and the infrastructure passing into and out of urban areas, such as transportation, communications, and distribution networks and their accessibility. Traditionally, urban planning followed a top-down approach in master planning the physical layout of human settlements. The primary concern was the public welfare, which included considerations of efficiency, sanitation, protection and use of the environment, as well as effects of the master plans on the social and economic activities. Over time, urban planning has adopted a focus on the social and environmental bottom-lines that focus on planning as a tool to improve the health and well-being of people while maintaining sustainability standards. Sustainable development was added as one of the main goals of all planning endeavors in the late 20th century when the detrimental economic and the environmental impacts of the previous models of planning had become apparent. Similarly, in the early 21st century, Jane Jacob's writings on legal and political perspectives to emphasize the interests of residents, businesses and communities effectively influenced urban planners to take into broader consideration of resident experiences and needs while planning.

Urban planning answers questions about how people will live, work and play in a given area and thus, guides orderly development in urban, suburban and rural areas. Although predominantly concerned with the planning of settlements and communities, urban planners are also responsible for planning the efficient transportation of goods, resources, people and waste; the distribution of basic necessities such as water and electricity; a sense of inclusion and opportunity for people of all kinds, culture and needs; economic growth or business development; improving health and conserving areas of natural environmental significance that actively contributes to reduction in  emissions as well as protecting heritage structures and built environments. Since most urban planning teams consist of highly educated individuals that work for city governments, recent debates focus on how to involve more community members in city planning processes.

Urban planning is an interdisciplinary field that includes civil engineering, architecture, human geography, politics, social science and design sciences. Practitioners of urban planning are concerned with research and analysis, strategic thinking, engineering architecture, urban design, public consultation, policy recommendations, implementation and management. It is closely related to the field of urban design and some urban planners provide designs for streets, parks, buildings and other urban areas. Urban planners work with the cognate fields of civil engineering, landscape architecture, architecture, and public administration to achieve strategic, policy and sustainability goals. Early urban planners were often members of these cognate fields though today, urban planning is a separate, independent professional discipline. The discipline of urban planning is the broader category that includes different sub-fields such as land-use planning, zoning, economic development, environmental planning, and transportation planning. Creating the plans requires a thorough understanding of penal codes and zonal codes of planning.

Another important aspect of urban planning is that the range of urban planning projects include the large-scale master planning of empty sites or Greenfield projects as well as small-scale interventions and refurbishments of existing structures, buildings and public spaces. Pierre Charles L'Enfant in Washington, D.C., Daniel Burnham in Chicago, Lúcio Costa in Brasília and Georges-Eugene Haussmann in Paris planned cities from scratch, and Robert Moses and Le Corbusier refurbished and transformed cities and neighborhoods to meet their ideas of urban planning.

History

There is evidence of urban planning and designed communities dating back to the Mesopotamian, Indus Valley, Minoan, and Egyptian civilizations in the third millennium BCE. Archaeologists studying the ruins of cities in these areas find paved streets that were laid out at right angles in a grid pattern. The idea of a planned out urban area evolved as different civilizations adopted it. Beginning in the 8th century BCE, Greek city states primarily used orthogonal (or grid-like) plans. Hippodamus of Miletus (498–408 BC), the ancient Greek architect and urban planner, is considered to be "the father of European urban planning", and the namesake of the "Hippodamian plan" (grid plan) of city layout.

The ancient Romans, inspired by the Greeks, also used orthogonal plans for their cities. City planning in the Roman world was developed for military defense and public convenience. The spread of the Roman Empire subsequently spread the ideas of urban planning. As the Roman Empire declined, these ideas slowly disappeared. However, many cities in Europe still held onto the planned Roman city center. Cities in Europe from the 9th to 14th centuries, often grew organically and sometimes chaotically. But in the following centuries with the coming of the Renaissance many new cities were enlarged with newly planned extensions. From the 15th century on, much more is recorded of urban design and the people that were involved. In this period, theoretical treatises on architecture and urban planning start to appear in which theoretical questions around planning the main lines, ensuring plans meet the needs of the given population and so forth are addressed and designs of towns and cities are described and depicted. During the Enlightenment period, several European rulers ambitiously attempted to redesign capital cities. During the Second French Empire, Baron Georges-Eugène Haussmann, under the direction of Napoleon III, redesigned the city of Paris into a more modern capital, with long, straight, wide boulevards.

Planning and architecture went through a paradigm shift at the turn of the 20th century. The industrialized cities of the 19th century grew at a tremendous rate. The evils of urban life for the working poor were becoming increasingly evident as a matter of public concern. The laissez-faire style of government management of the economy, in fashion for most of the Victorian era, was starting to give way to a New Liberalism that championed intervention on the part of the poor and disadvantaged. Around 1900, theorists began developing urban planning models to mitigate the consequences of the industrial age, by providing citizens, especially factory workers, with healthier environments. The following century would therefore be globally dominated by a central planning approach to urban planning, not necessarily representing an increment in the overall quality of the urban realm.

At the beginning of the 20th century, urban planning began to be recognized as a separate profession. The Town and Country Planning Association was founded in 1899 and the first academic course in Great Britain on urban planning was offered by the University of Liverpool in 1909. In the 1920s, the ideas of modernism and uniformity began to surface in urban planning, and lasted until the 1970s. In 1933, Le Corbusier presented the Radiant City, a city that grows up in the form of towers, as a solution to the problem of pollution and over-crowding. But many planners started to believe that the ideas of modernism in urban planning led to higher crime rates and social problems.

In the second half of the 20th century, urban planners gradually shifted their focus to individualism and diversity in urban centers.

21st century practices 

Urban planners studying the effects of increasing congestion in urban areas began to address the externalities, the negative impacts caused by induced demand from larger highway systems in western countries such as in the United States. The United Nations Department of Economic and Social Affairs predicted in 2018 that around 2.5 billion more people occupy urban areas by 2050 according to population elements of global migration. New planning theories have adopted non-traditional concepts such as Blue Zones and Innovation Districts to incorporate geographic areas within the city that allow for novel business development and the prioritization of infrastructure that would assist with improving the quality of life of citizens by extending their potential lifespan.

Planning practices have incorporated policy changes to help address anthropocentric global climate change. London began to charge a congestion charge for cars trying to access already crowded places in the city. Cities nowadays stress the importance of public transit and cycling by adopting such policies.

Theories

Planning theory is the body of scientific concepts, definitions, behavioral relationships, and assumptions that define the body of knowledge of urban planning. There are eight procedural theories of planning that remain the principal theories of planning procedure today: the rational-comprehensive approach, the incremental approach, the transactive approach, the communicative approach, the advocacy approach, the equity approach, the radical approach, and the humanist or phenomenological approach. Some other conceptual planning theories include Ebenezer Howard's The Three Magnets theory that he envisioned for the future of British settlement, also his Garden Cities, the Concentric Model Zone also called the Burgess Model by sociologist Ernest Burgess, the Radburn Superblock that encourages pedestrian movement, the Sector Model and the Multiple Nuclei Model among others.

Technical aspects

Technical aspects of urban planning involve the application of scientific, technical processes, considerations and features that are involved in planning for land use, urban design, natural resources, transportation, and infrastructure. Urban planning includes techniques such as: predicting population growth, zoning, geographic mapping and analysis, analyzing park space, surveying the water supply, identifying transportation patterns, recognizing food supply demands, allocating healthcare and social services, and analyzing the impact of land use.

In order to predict how cities will develop and estimate the effects of their interventions, planners use various models. These models can be used to indicate relationships and patterns in demographic, geographic, and economic data. They might deal with short-term issues such as how people move through cities, or long-term issues such as land use and growth. One such model is the Geographic Information System (GIS) that is used to create a model of the existing planning and then to project future impacts on the society, economy and environment.

Building codes and other regulations dovetail with urban planning by governing how cities are constructed and used from the individual level. Enforcement methodologies include governmental zoning, planning permissions, and building codes, as well as private easements and restrictive covenants.

Urban planners

An urban planner is a professional who works in the field of urban planning for the purpose of optimizing the effectiveness of a community's land use and infrastructure. They formulate plans for the development and management of urban and suburban areas, typically analyzing land use compatibility as well as economic, environmental and social trends. In developing any plan for a community (whether commercial, residential, agricultural, natural or recreational), urban planners must consider a wide array of issues including sustainability, existing and potential pollution, transport including potential congestion, crime, land values, economic development, social equity, zoning codes, and other legislation.

The importance of the urban planner is increasing in the 21st century, as modern society begins to face issues of increased population growth, climate change and unsustainable development. An urban planner could be considered a green collar professional.

Some researchers suggest that urban planners around the world work in different "planning cultures", adapted to their local cities and cultures. However, professionals have identified skills, abilities and basic knowledge sets that are common to urban planners across national and regional boundaries.

Criticisms and debates 
The school of neoclassical economics argues that planning is unnecessary, or even harmful, because market efficiency allows for effective land use. A pluralist strain of political thinking argues in a similar vein that the government should not intrude in the political competition between different interest groups which decides how land is used. The traditional justification for urban planning has in response been that the planner does to the city what the engineer or architect does to the home, that is, make it more amenable to the needs and preferences of its inhabitants.

The widely adopted consensus-building model of planning, which seeks to accommodate different preferences within the community has been criticized for being based upon, rather than challenging, the power structures of the community. Instead, agonism has been proposed as a framework for urban planning decision-making.

Another debate within the urban planning field is about who is included and excluded in the urban planning decision-making process. Most urban planning processes use a top-down approach which fails to include the residents of the places where urban planners and city officials are working. Sherry Arnstein's "ladder of citizen participation" is oftentimes used by many urban planners and city governments to determine the degree of inclusivity or exclusivity of their urban planning. One main source of engagement between city officials and residents are city council meetings that are open to the residents and that welcome public comments. Additionally, there are some federal requirements for citizen participation in government-funded infrastructure projects.

Many urban planners and planning agencies rely on community input for their policies and zoning plans. How effective community engagement is can be determined by how member's voices are heard and implemented.

Participatory urban planning 
Participatory planning in the United States emerged during the 1960s and 1970s. At the same time, participatory planning began to enter the development field, with similar characteristics and agendas. There are many notable urban planners and activists whose work facilitated and shaped participatory planning movements. Jane Jacobs and her work is one of the most significant contributions to participatory planning  because of the influence it had across the entire United States. There has also been a recent emergence in engaging youth in urban planning education.

See also

 Air pollution
 Aire de mise en valeur de l'architecture et du paysage
 Behavioral urbanism
 Bicycle-friendly
 Circulation planning
 Cycling infrastructure
 Development studies
 Domestic travel restrictions
 Elbow roomers
 Epidemiology
 Hazard mitigation
 Index of urban planning articles
 Land recycling
 List of planned cities
 List of planning journals
 List of urban planners
 List of urban plans
 List of urban theorists
 Living street
 Low emission zone
 Noise pollution
 Permeability
 Planning cultures
 Regional planning
 Road traffic safety
 Rural development
 Smart city
 Universal design
 Urban design
 Urban density
 Urban economics
 Urban planning education
 Urban green space
 Urban history
 Urban informatics
 Urban planning in communist countries
 Urban studies
 Urban theory
 Urban vitality
 Walkability
 Walking audit
 Stroad

References

Further reading
 
Knox, P. L. (2020) Better by Design?: Architecture, Urban Planning, and the Good City. Blacksburg: Virginia Tech Publishing. DOI: https://doi.org/10.21061/better-by-design

External links

American Planning Association

Library guides for urban planning